Harriet Ellen Siderowna von Rathlef-Keilmann, (3 January 1887 – 1 May 1933), was a German sculptor and writer of children's books.

Life and work
She was born to a prominent Jewish family in Riga, Livonia, a province of the Russian Empire. She married Harald von Rathlef, a lieutenant in the Czarist Regiment of the Alexander Hussars, in 1908 in Riga. The couple had four children. The family fled to Germany on December 28, 1918, in an effort to escape from revolutionary Russia. The family settled near Weimar, Germany, where she  studied under Walter Gropius at the Bauhaus until 1921. She divorced her husband in 1922 and supported her children with the income from her sculptures, graphics and illustrations.

In 1925 she became a major proponent of Anna Anderson's claim to be Grand Duchess Anastasia Nikolaevna of Russia. She befriended the claimant and wrote a series of articles about her. In the same year she converted to Roman Catholicism.

She was involved in artistic circles and social causes in Berlin, but was forced to resign from the Society of Berlin Women Artists when Adolf Hitler rose to power. Alarmed by the political developments in Nazi Germany, she hoped to leave the country. Before she could make definite plans, she died in Berlin on 1 May 1933 of a burst appendix.

In Falk Harnack's 1956 film, The Story of Anastasia, she was portrayed by German actress Käthe Braun.

References

External links

1887 births
1933 deaths
German women artists
Bauhaus alumni
Converts to Roman Catholicism from Judaism
German children's writers
German Roman Catholics
Artists from Riga
White Russian emigrants to Germany
German women children's writers
Baltic-German people
Emigrants from the Russian Empire to Germany